Francis White may refer to:

Politics
 Francis White (Australian politician) (1830–1875), New South Wales politician
 Francis White (diplomat) (1892–1961), U.S. Ambassador to Czechoslovakia, Mexico, Sweden
 Francis White (soldier) (died 1657), English soldier and politician who sat in the House of Commons in 1656
 Francis White (Virginia politician) (1761–1826), U.S. Representative from Virginia
 Francis S. White (1847–1922), U.S. Senator from Alabama

Other
 Francis White (bishop) (c. 1564–1638), English bishop
 Francis White (surgeon) (1787–1859), president of the Royal College of Surgeons in Ireland
 Francis Buchanan White (1842–1894), Scottish entomologist
 Francis Le Grix White (1819–1887), British geologist
 Eg White (born 1966), stage name of Francis White, British musician, songwriter and producer

See also
 Frank White (disambiguation)
 Frances White (disambiguation)
 François Blanc (disambiguation)